Philemon Raul Masinga (28 June 1969 – 13 January 2019) was a South African professional footballer and manager who played as a striker from 1990 to 2002.

He played in the English Premier League for Leeds United, and Italian Serie A for Salernitana and Bari. He also played for Jomo Cosmos, Mamelodi Sundowns with his cousin Bennett Masinga, St. Gallen and Al-Wahda. He represented South Africa in 58 international games, scoring 18 goals. In 2006, he briefly went into football management with PJ Stars.

Club career
He made his debut for Jomo Cosmos in 1990, before moving on to Mamelodi Sundowns.

In 1994 he left for English Premier League club Leeds United; the deal that his agent Marcelo Houseman did with Leeds manager Howard Wilkinson also involved Lucas Radebe moving to Leeds from Kaizer Chiefs. He played in the English Premier League for two years, playing 31 games and scoring five goals, and also scored a hat-trick in an FA Cup tie against Walsall on 17 January 1995.

Masinga moved to Switzerland with St. Gallen in 1996, followed by spells in Italy with Salernitana and Bari. In 2001, a return to English Football with Coventry City fell through after he failed to secure a work permit, following which he moved to Al Wahda FC in Abu Dhabi where he completed his playing career.

International career
Masinga made his international debut in July 1992 against Cameroon; this was South Africa's first match following readmission of the country to international football.
In an African Cup of Nations qualifier versus Zambia in 1992, Masinga became the first South African ever to be sent off in an international match. He was in the Bafana Bafana side when South Africa won the African Cup of Nations in 1996 and when they finished second to Egypt in the 1998 African Cup of Nations. "Chippa", as he was affectionately known, scored the decisive goal in the 1997 game against the Republic of the Congo that took South Africa to the 1998 World Cup in France.  He played 58 games for his country, scoring 18 goals.

International goals

Management
In 2006, Masinga briefly coached PJ Stars, a now-defunct third-division South African club.

Honours
Jomo Cosmos
 Nedbank Cup: 1990
Mamelodi Sundowns
 National Soccer League: 1993
South Africa
 Africa Cup of Nations winners: 1996
 Africa Cup of Nations runner-up: 1998

Death
On 13 January 2019, the president of the South African Football Association, Danny Jordaan, announced his death. Masinga had been admitted to hospital the previous month, due to cancer.

See also
List of African association football families

References

External links

Klerksdorper.com The Number One Internet Site for Klerksdorp

1969 births
2019 deaths
People from Klerksdorp
Sportspeople from North West (South African province)
Expatriate footballers in England
South African expatriate sportspeople in England
South African soccer players
Place of death missing
South Africa international soccer players
South African expatriate soccer players
Leeds United F.C. players
Premier League players
1996 African Cup of Nations players
1998 African Cup of Nations players
1997 FIFA Confederations Cup players
1998 FIFA World Cup players
Jomo Cosmos F.C. players
Kaizer Chiefs F.C. players
Mamelodi Sundowns F.C. players
Al Wahda FC players
S.S.C. Bari players
U.S. Salernitana 1919 players
Serie A players
Serie B players
Expatriate footballers in Italy
South African expatriate sportspeople in Italy
FC St. Gallen players
Swiss Super League players
Expatriate footballers in Switzerland
South African expatriate sportspeople in Switzerland
Expatriate footballers in the United Arab Emirates
South African expatriate sportspeople in the United Arab Emirates
Association football forwards
UAE Pro League players
Deaths from cancer in South Africa